The Premios People en Español 2013 are organized by the magazine People en Español and will be held in November of the same year. On October 5, 2013 was announced the list of nominees.

Awards and Nominations for Novela

Telenovelas

Teleovela of the Year

Best Actress

Best Actor

Best Female Villain

Best Male Villain

Best Supporting Actress

Couple of the Year

Best New Talent of the Year

Televisión

Entertainment Program of the Year

Presenter of the Year

Program of the Year Competition

References 

American television awards
2013 in American television